Robert Enrique Hernández Aguado (born 14 September 1993 in Caracas) is a Venezuelan professional footballer who plays as a midfielder for Deportivo Táchira.

On January 29, 2015, the Rowdies announced Hernández and Georgi Hristov would be switching positions ( to work better under head coach Thomas Rongen's new system.

On December 16, 2015, it was announced that the Rowdies had declined Hernández's contract option. Hernández subsequently joined Caracas FC in his hometown.

External links

Tampa Bay Rowdies Profile

References

1993 births
Living people
People from Caracas
Venezuelan footballers
Venezuelan expatriate footballers
Venezuela under-20 international footballers
Association football midfielders
Deportivo Anzoátegui players
Tampa Bay Rowdies players
Caracas FC players
Club Always Ready players
Venezuelan Primera División players
North American Soccer League players
Bolivian Primera División players
Venezuelan expatriate sportspeople in the United States
Venezuelan expatriate sportspeople in Bolivia
Expatriate soccer players in the United States
Expatriate footballers in Bolivia